is a line of wafer snacks produced by Lotte, made notable for the randomly assorted bonus stickers included inside each snack. First released in 1977, Bikkuriman (ビックリマン, “Surprise Man”) became wildly popular in Japan with the introduction of the Akuma vs Tenshi Seal (悪魔VS天使シール, "Devil VS Angel Seal") series of stickers, leading to a prolific number of media tie-ins.

History
Bikkuriman is a chocolate and peanut wafer snack made by Lotte that sold for 30 yen at the time of its introduction. Originally, the pack-in stickers were called “Dokkiri Seal” (どっきりシール, “Shocking Seal). Each Seal featured a realistic image on a clear background, with the intention of using them for pranks or gags (broken glass, clothing tears, fake wall switches, etc.) By the 1980s, the Seals began featuring individual gag-based characters with a theme that united a particular set of Seals. These style of stickers would remain for the first 9 sets of Seal releases.

In August of 1985, Lotte released the first of the Akuma vs Tenshi Seal series. While maintaining the same humorous art style of the earlier series, the Akuma vs Tenshi Seals featured characters based on assorted mythological, folklore, and even metaphorical sources engaging in an overarching story-line. Akin to the Mars Attacks trading card series from America, the battle between the Tenshi and Akuma is told on the back of each sticker, with the plot progressing with each new set. Each set was divided into several themed tiers featuring a Tenshi, Akuma, and an Omamori (お守り, "Protector"), with an ultra-rare "Head" Seal that serves as the main character of its particular set. The Head Seals were typically printed with a prism or holographic holofoil to set them apart from the Tenshi's metallic silver or gold backing, the clear backgrounds of the Omamori and the multi-colored backgrounds of the Akuma. The rarity of the early Akuma vs Tenshi Seals were, in order: Head, Tenshi, Omamori, Akuma.

Unfortunately, the popularity of the stickers led to trouble for the series. The zeal to try to obtain Head Seals would lead children to buy Bikkuriman in mass quantities, retrieve the stickers inside, and simply throw away the snack. This, along with the fact that children and collectors were willing to pay high amounts of money for the rarer cards, led to parent groups expressing concern of possible gambling implications for the stickers. This led to action by the Japanese Fair Trade Commission, and the number of Head Seals per pack was increased from the average 4 to 24 individual Seals.

Licensed collaborations

Various media properties have run collaboration seal series with Bikkuriman, including Monster Hunter, Demon Slayer: Kimetsu no Yaiba,,Dragon Ball Super, GeGeGe no Kitaro,Jujutsu Kaisen,Dragon Quest: Dai no Daibouken, Hatsune Miku, Star Wars, One Piece, Mobile Suit Gundam,and Persona 3. 

Some have featured celebrities, such as AKB48 members and Vtubers including Hikakin.

There have also been figurine collaborations, featuring properties including Neon Genesis Evangelion.

There was even a Bikkuriman edition of the Game of Life.

Anime
These stickers were a huge success, leading to a multitude of media tie-ins. The original Bikkuriman anime series, created by Toei Animation, aired from October 11, 1987, to April 2, 1989. Sequels include  Shin Bikkuriman, Super Bikkuriman, Bikkuriman 2000 and Happy Lucky Bikkuriman.

Manga
Super Bikkuriman, a series published  by Shōgakukan

Video games
Two Bikkuriman video games were made for the PC Engine console in Japan. One of which is a reskin of Wonder Boy in Monster Land. Other games were also made for the Famicom, Game Boy, Super Famicom, Dreamcast, Neo Geo Pocket, Game Boy Color, Nintendo DS, mobile phones and Nintendo 3DS.

Bikkuriman World (1987, PC Engine) - Hudson Soft
Bikkuriman World ~Gekitō hijiri senshi~ (ビックリマンワールド～激闘聖戦士～)(1990, Famicom) - an RPG by Hudson Soft
Super Bikkuriman ~Densetsu no Sekiban~ (スーパービックリマン～伝説の石板～）(Game Boy) - by Yutaka
Super Bikkuriman (スーパービックリマン）(Super Famicom) - Interbec
Bikkuriman Daijikai (ビックリマン大事界) (PC CD-ROM)
Bikkuriman 2000 Charging Card GB (ビックリマン２０００チャージングカードGB) (2000, Game Boy Color)
Bikkuriman 2000 Viva! Festiva! (ビックリマン2000 ビバ!フェスチバァ!) (Sega Dreamcast)
Bikkuriman (April 18, 2011 GREE/mixi, December 17, 2012 Android) - Drecom
Bikkuriman Collectors' Battle (DeNA)
Bikkuriman Daijiten (ビックリマン大事典) (2007, Nintendo DS)

Heads List

 1st Dan Head - Super Zeus
 2nd Dan Head - Shaman Kahn
 3rd Dan Head - Super Devil
 4th Dan Head - Satan Maria
 5th Dan Head - St. Phoenix
 6th Dan Head - Shiso Jura, Black Zues
 7th Dan Head - Herachrist
 8th Dan Head - Masho Nero
 9th Dan Head - Headrococo
10th Dan Head - Mataiden Noa
11th Dan Head - Wander Maria, Ghost Alibaba
12th Dan Head - Yasei Erusa M, Master P, St. Bon Miroku
13th Dan Head - Yamato Bakushin
14th Dan Head - Seishin Nadia
15th Dan Head - St. Bon Indust
16th Dan Head - Andrococo

References

External links
 Official Website
 Complete Akuma vs Tensi list
 Bikkuriman (2nd) - Toei Animation
 Super Bikkuriman - Toei Animation
 

1987 anime television series debuts
1988 anime films
1989 anime television series debuts
1992 anime television series debuts
1999 anime television series debuts
2006 anime television series debuts
CoroCoro Comic
Toei Animation television
Asahi Broadcasting Corporation original programming
TV Tokyo original programming
TV Asahi original programming
Inactive online games